Federation of Regional Parties (FPR) was a Spanish electoral list in the European Parliament election in 1989 made up from several centre-right regionalist parties. Navarrese People's Union (UPN) and the Regionalist Aragonese Party (PAR) were initially also expected to join the Federation, but chose to support the newly-founded People's Party (PP) instead.

Composition

References

Defunct political party alliances in Spain
Regionalist parties in Spain